Freecharge is an Indian financial services company based in Gurugram. It allows users to pay bills such as electricity, gas and telephone, as well as recharge mobile, broadband, DTH and metro cards. In addition, it enables the users to invest in mutual funds and get credit through Freecharge EMI.

On 8 April 2015, Snapdeal acquired Freecharge in what was referred to as the second biggest takeover in the Indian e-commerce sector at the time, after the buy out of Ibibo by rival MakeMyTrip. The deal was for approximately US$400 million in cash and stock. On 27 July 2017, Axis Bank acquired Freecharge for $60 million.

History

Freecharge was founded in August 2010 by Kunal Shah and Sandeep Tandon. After receiving seed funding of an undisclosed amount from Tandon Group and Sequoia Capital in 2010, the company secured Series A funding of ₹200 million from Sequoia Capital in 2011. In November 2012, the company claimed to be doing online recharge of ₹6 million on a daily basis, translating to ₹2.19 billion a year.

In 2011, Freecharge was named one of the most promising technology startups from India by Pluggd.in.

On 1 September 2014, Freecharge received $33 Million Series B Funding from Sequoia Capital, Sofina and Ru-Net, which was one of the biggest fund raising by an Indian technology startup. On 6 February 2015, Freecharge further raised $80 million from Hong Kong-based fund Tybourne Capital Management and SF-based fund Valiant Capital Management and existing investors. Freecharge is building an advertising platform that will capture online and offline purchase behavior and brand preferences of consumers, by offering incentives and discount coupons to users to transact on its platform.

On 8 April 2015, Indian e-commerce firm Snapdeal acquired Freecharge for ₹2800 crore (US$400 million) in cash and stock. In March 2017, Snapdeal announced Jason Kothari will be the new CEO of Freecharge. Snapdeal decided to invest $20 million into the same.

April 2016, FreeCharge rolls out Chat and Pay – feature in its app where merchants and customers can connect over chat and just initiate payments.

On 18 May 2017, Jasper Infotech, which owns and operates Freecharge, decided to invest ₹22 Crore more in the company, making it its third such investment.

On 27 July 2017, it was officially reported that Axis Bank bought out Freecharge for $60 million.

On 22 March 2017, Ankit Khanna was appointed as COO. Prior to this, Khanna was the chief product officer of the company.

March 30, 2018, FreeCharge enables BHIM UPI on its Digital Wallet platform.

On 27 August 2019, Freecharge launched Digital Credit Cards.

References

Financial services companies established in 2010
Online financial services companies of India
Companies based in Gurgaon
Internet properties established in 2010
2010 establishments in Haryana
Privately held companies of India
Mobile payments in India
Axis Bank